Willow Johnson  is a Canadian voice actress who has worked in Vancouver, voicing characters in English language versions of anime and cartoons. She is best known for voicing Kasumi Tendo in the Ranma ½ series, Lalah Sune in the Mobile Suit Gundam series, Kikyo in the Inuyasha series, and Starlight in the My Little Pony Tales series. Her first role in animation was when she was 12 years old in a Canadian show called Camp Candy.
She is married to musician Ken LaTour and has one child.

Filmography

Animation

Anime

Video games

References

External links

Willow Johnson at Crystal Acids Voice Actor Database

Actresses from Vancouver
Canadian child actresses
Canadian film actresses
Canadian video game actresses
Canadian voice actresses
Living people
20th-century Canadian actresses
21st-century Canadian actresses
Year of birth missing (living people)